Dactyloceras ducarmei is a moth in the family Brahmaeidae. It was described by Thierry Bouyer in 2002. It is found in the Democratic Republic of the Congo.

References

Brahmaeidae
Moths described in 2002
Endemic fauna of the Democratic Republic of the Congo